The Başbağlar massacre is the name given to the 5 July 1993 massacre of 33 civilians in the village of Başbağlar (which was then burnt down), in Erzincan Province during the Kurdish-Turkish conflict. While the attack was originally attributed to the Kurdistan Workers' Party (PKK), the former Turkish special forces soldier Ayhan Çarkın claimed that the deep state was behind the massacre. But later he then said that all of his claims were "just predictions". The leader of the PKK, Abdullah Öcalan while in prison stated that massacre was committed by a PKK member codenamed "Dr. Baran".

Background 
The small village of Başbağlar is located 220 kilometers from the city of Erzincan in the eastern Anatolian province of Erzincan's Kemaliye district.

Incident
Turkish authorities claimed that approximately 100 heavily armed militants rampaged through the village, dragged all the civilians to the village square and burned their homes and property. After an hour of propaganda session dozens of men from the village were killed in front of their families. The militants then moved on to setting the whole village on fire. 214 homes, a school, a mosque, a clinic and a community center were burnt down.

The Başbağlar massacre is considered one of the bloodiest mass killings in the history of the PKK.

Investigation
Nearly twenty people were allegedly arrested as part of the investigation, in which two people were jailed and sentenced to life imprisonment for being members of the PKK. Turkish authorities claimed that although the PKK apparently claimed responsibility for the attack, during interrogations, jailed PKK leader Abdullah Öcalan said that he had been unaware of the incident and stated that a PKK member codenamed Dr. Baran was responsible for the incident. In 1998 the case was closed.

Reactions 
On 5 July 2010, the Turkish minister Faruk Çelik visited Başbağlar to commemorate the day, he said: "No matter how many years pass after this incident, we will never forget this sorrow and those who caused it.”

References 

Arson in Turkey
History of Erzincan Province
July 1993 events in Europe
Kurdistan Workers' Party attacks
Massacres in Turkey
Mass murder in Turkey
Massacres of men
Terrorist incidents in Turkey
Massacres in 1993
Mass murder in 1993
Terrorist incidents in Turkey in 1993
Violence against men in Asia
1993 murders in Turkey